Walter Benítez may refer to:

 Walter Benítez (manager) (born 1972), Cuban football manager
 Walter Benítez (footballer) (born 1993), Argentine goalkeeper